Torodora galera is a moth in the family Lecithoceridae. It is found in southeastern China (Fujian). Earlier records from Taiwan were in 2003 described as a distinct species, Torodora pseudogalera, with Torodora galera still appearing in some checklists of Taiwanese fauna but not others.

References

Torodora
Moths of Asia
Moths described in 1994